Rachael Cairns (born 11 August 1988) is a British model and actress. She is best known for participating in Cycle 4 of Britain's Next Top Model, in which she placed fourth. She has also appeared in acting roles, including an episode of Waterloo Road as Tasha Lefton, a diabetic pupil who went as far as refusing to take insulin so that she can lose weight, to be "Rochdale's next top model".

Britain's Next Top Model
Cairns was announced as one of the fourteen girls who participated in Britain's Next Top Model, Cycle 4. During her run in the competition, she accumulated 3 first call-outs, tying with eventual winner Alex Evans, and one bottom two appearance. Throughout her stay she was often criticised for being fake and was labelled a 'Bible Basher'. She appeared in the bottom two with eventual second runner-up Stefanie Wilson, the judges decided to send her home.

After Top Model
Cairns was immediately signed to Models 1 in London, after appearing on the show, being the first non-winning Britain's Next Top Model contestant to be signed by the prize agency.  A year later, she had left Models 1 and joined Nevs, another agency based in London.
She also appeared on ITV2's The Fashion Show along with Britain's Next Top Model, Cycle 3 winner, Lauren McAvoy, and walked for Graeme Black at London Fashion Week.  She made an appearance in Series 4, Episode 17 of Waterloo Road as disruptive pupil, Tasha Lefton, which was aired on 29 April 2009 on BBC1. She is currently studying Performing Arts at an exclusive New York Institute. Rachael is now a Personal Assistant to Reality TV Matriarch Kris Jenner.

Filmography

References

External links
Official site
Models 1 Portfolio

English television actresses
English soap opera actresses
Living people
People from Garforth
English female models
1988 births
Britain & Ireland's Next Top Model contestants